Tsunta is a rural locality (a selo) and the administrative center of  Tsuntinsky District of the Republic of Dagestan, Russia. 

Between 1991 and 2017 the selo of Kidero served as the administrative center of Tsuntinsky District, however, it lacks the necessary infrastructure. In 2017, the district center was moved to Tsunta.

References

Notes

Sources

Rural localities in Tsuntinsky District